William A. "Rory" Cross (born May 23, 1936) was an American politician in the state of Wyoming. He served in the Wyoming House of Representatives as a member of the Republican Party.

He served as Speaker of the Wyoming House of Representatives from 1991 to 1993. He attended Yale University and is a rancher.

References

1936 births
Living people
Speakers of the Wyoming House of Representatives
Republican Party members of the Wyoming House of Representatives
Yale University alumni
Ranchers from Wyoming
People from Douglas, Wyoming